Warren Delano Jr. (July 13, 1809 – January 17, 1898) was an American merchant and drug smuggler who made a large fortune smuggling illegal opium into China. He was the maternal grandfather of U.S. President Franklin Delano Roosevelt.

Early life
 
Delano was born on July 13, 1809, in New Bedford, Massachusetts. He was the eldest son of Captain Warren Delano, Sr. (1779–1866) and Deborah Perry (née Church) Delano. After his mother's death in 1827, his father, who was involved in the New England sea trade, remarried to Elizabeth Adams, a widow of Captain Parker of the United States Navy. Among his siblings were brothers Frederick Delano, Edward Delano and Franklin Hughes Delano, who was married to Laura Astor, a daughter of William Backhouse Astor Sr. and a sister of, among others, John Jacob Astor III and William Backhouse Astor Jr.

A descendant of Philip Delano (a Pilgrim who arrived in Plymouth, Massachusetts, in 1621), Warren Jr.'s paternal grandparents were Ephraim Delano and Elisabeth (née Cushman) Delano, and his maternal grandparents were Joseph Church and Deborah (née Perry) Church.

He graduated from the Fairhaven Academy at the age of 15 and by age 17 was a trader in the import business.

Career

Delano made a large fortune smuggling opium into Canton (now Guangzhou), China. Opium, a highly addictive narcotic related to heroin, was illegal in China.

By the 1800s, European demand for Chinese luxury products such as silk, tea, porcelain ("china"), and furniture was immense, but Chinese demand for European products was relatively weak. As a result, many European nations ran large trade deficits with China. Foreign traders such as the Scottish merchant William Jardine of Jardine Matheson introduced large-scale opium smuggling into China in order to reduce this trade imbalance and to gain further access to coveted Chinese products. The vast increase in opium smuggling into China resulted in millions of people becoming newly addicted to opium in China, and in an unprecedented Chinese trade imbalance with foreign powers, which in turn resulted in the First Opium War of 1840–1843.

Delano first went to China at age 24 to work for Russell & Company, which had pioneered trading with China. John Perkins Cushingalso a Russell & Company partnerhad preceded Delano and initiated a close relationship with the largest Chinese hong merchant called Howqua. The two men had established an offshore basean anchored floating warehousewhere Russell & Company ships would offload their opium contraband before continuing up the Pearl River Delta to Canton with their legal cargo.

By early 1843, Delano had prospered greatly in the Chinese opium trade, rising to  become the head partner of the biggest American firm trading with China. He had witnessed the destruction of the Canton system, the humiliation of the Chinese government, and the creation of New China.

In the 1850s, Delano, along with his brother Franklin and Asa Packer (the builder of the Lehigh Valley Railroad and founder of Lehigh University), headed a land company that purchased several thousand acres and established the town of Delano, Pennsylvania.

Delano lost much of his fortune in the Panic of 1857. In 1860, he returned to China, except this time he went to Hong Kong where he rebuilt his fortune.  During the U.S. Civil War, Delano shipped opium to the Medical Bureau of the U.S. War Department.

Personal life

On November 1, 1843, Delano was married to Catherine Robbins Lyman (1825–1896), a daughter of Joseph Lyman and Anne Jean (née Robbins) Lyman, during a short visit to Massachusetts. Together, they were the parents of:

 Susan Maria Delano (1844–1846), who died young.
 Louisa Church Delano (1846–1869), who died unmarried.
 Deborah Perry Delano (1847–1940), who married merchant William Howell Forbes of the Forbes family. After William died in 1896, she married his brother Paul Revere Forbes in 1903.
 Anne Lyman Delano (1849–1926), who married merchant Frederic Delano Hitch in 1877.
 Warren Delano III (1850–1851), who died young.
 Warren Delano IV (1852–1920), who married Jennie Walters, the only daughter of merchant William Thompson Walters.
 Sara Ann Delano (1854–1941), who married James Roosevelt I.
 Philippe Delano (1857–1881), who died unmarried.
 Katherine Robbins Delano (1860–1953), who married Charles Albert Robbins in 1882. After his death in 1889, she married Hiram Price Collier, a Unitarian minister.
 Frederic Adrian Delano (1863–1953), who married Matilda Anne Peasley and served as president of the Monon Railroad.
 Laura Franklin Delano (1864–1884), who died unmarried.

In 1851, Delano bought 60 acres on the Hudson River in Balmville, New York (two miles north of Newburgh). He commissioned Andrew Jackson Downing and Calvert Vaux to remodel an existing farmhouse into an Italianate villa, naming it Algonac.  His grandson Franklin Roosevelt was married at Algonac in 1905.

Death and burial

His wife Catherine died on February 10, 1896, in Newburgh.  Delano died at Algonac on January 17, 1898, of bronchial pneumonia.  After a funeral there, he was buried next to his wife in the Delano Family Tomb at Riverside Cemetery in Fairhaven, Massachusetts (which Delano had established in 1850). The tomb was erected in 1859 and designed by Richard Morris Hunt.

Descendants

Through his daughter Sara, he was a grandfather of the 32nd President of the United States Franklin Delano Roosevelt, who married his fifth cousin, Eleanor Roosevelt, and was the father of six children, Anna Eleanor Roosevelt, James Roosevelt II, Franklin Roosevelt (who died in infancy), Elliott Roosevelt, Franklin D. Roosevelt Jr., and John Aspinwall Roosevelt II.

Through his daughter Katherine, he was a grandfather of four, including diplomat Warren Delano Robbins and Katharine Price Collier, a Republican U.S. Representative who in 1917 married George St. George, third son of the second Sir Richard St George, 2nd Baronet.

Legacy
Both Delano, Pennsylvania, and Delano Township, Schuylkill County, Pennsylvania, were named for Warren Delano Jr.

Notes

References

External links
 Painting of Algonac, Home of Warren Delano, North of Newburgh, New York at the Smithsonian
 Photograph of Algonac in the Franklin D. Roosevelt Library.

1809 births
1898 deaths
Warren
People from New Bedford, Massachusetts
American merchants
American drug traffickers
19th-century American businesspeople